Music of Eric Wild is a Canadian music television series which aired on CBC Television in 1961.

Premise
This Winnipeg-produced series featured Eric Wild conducting a 17-person orchestra. Among the guest artists were singers Len Cariou, Ed Evanko, Florence Faiers, Evelyn Snider and Maxine Ware. Pianist Mitch Parks and violinist Marta Hidy were also guests.

Scheduling
This half-hour series was broadcast Sundays at 4:30 p.m. (Eastern) from 28 May to 25 June 1961.

See also
 Music Stand

References

External links
 

CBC Television original programming
1961 Canadian television series debuts
1961 Canadian television series endings